The following is a list of episodes of the Australian satirical television comedy series The Chaser's War on Everything.

There are currently 58 episodes which have aired, excluding three "Best of" episodes.

Series overview

Series 1 (2006)

Series 2 (2007)

Series 3 (2009)

See also

The Chaser
The Chaser's War on Everything
Chaser's War on Everything, The